The Willesden United Synagogue Cemetery, usually known as Willesden Jewish Cemetery, is a Jewish cemetery at Beaconsfield Road, Willesden, in the London Borough of Brent, England. It opened in 1873 on a  site. It has been described as the "Rolls-Royce" of London's Jewish cemeteries and is designated Grade II on Historic England's Register of Historic Parks and Gardens. 
The cemetery, which has 29,800 graves, has many significant memorials and monuments. Four of them are listed at Grade II. They include the tomb of Rosalind Franklin, who was a co-discoverer of the structure of DNA.

In 2015, the United Synagogue, which owns and manages the cemetery, was awarded a grant from the National Lottery Heritage Fund to restore some key features of the cemetery and to create a visitor centre, a permanent exhibition and a web-based education project. The cemetery's heritage project, House of Life, officially opened up the cemetery to visitors on 7 September 2020: it has a programme of public outreach events that have included walking tours, an online literary festival ("Life Lines") and an exhibition at Willesden Library.

History and heritage listing

The cemetery, developed on ground purchased from All Souls College, Oxford, was opened in 1873, three years after the United Synagogue was established by Act of Parliament. It was expanded in 1890, in 1906 and between 1925 and 1926. The cemetery and its funerary buildings, in English Gothic style, were designed by the architect Nathan Solomon Joseph (1834–1909).

In 2017 Historic England listed the cemetery at Grade II on the grounds of: its being the first venture of the United Synagogue; its having associations with many influential families and individuals who are buried there; its overall design by a prominent Jewish architect; "the quality, opulence and variety displayed by the monuments as a group, reflecting both Jewish traditions and English influences"; and its survival – "the Old Cemetery remains intact, whilst the subsequent evolution of the cemetery is well-documented and legible".

War graves and listed war memorial

The cemetery has 33 Commonwealth service war graves from World War I, six of which form a small group by the Assembly Hall, and 77 from World War II, 22 of them grouped in a war graves plot. These include the grave of Dudley Joel (1904–1941), businessman and Conservative Party politician, who died in World War II.

In place of a Cross of Sacrifice, a memorial designed by Ralph Hobday in the form of an obelisk was placed in 1961 by the Commonwealth War Graves Commission opposite the World War II war graves plot. It commemorates both world wars. Israel Brodie, the Chief Rabbi, consecrated the memorial, which was unveiled by Field Marshal Sir Gerald Templer. The first national Jewish war memorial in the UK, it is Grade II listed.

Other listed monuments

There are three other Grade II listed monuments at the cemetery:

 The tomb of Maximilian (Max) Eberstadt (1844–1891), who was secretary to the British merchant banker Ernest Cassel. His tomb was designed by Edward Burne-Jones

The tomb of Rosalind Franklin (1920–1958), a chemist and X-ray crystallographer, who was a co-discoverer of the structure of DNA
The tombs and burial enclosures of Baron Mayer Amschel de Rothschild (1818–1874), a businessman and Liberal Party MP, his wife Juliana (1818–1874) and their daughter Hannah Primrose (1851–1890), who became Countess of Rosebery and a political hostess and philanthropist. Their tombs were housed in a mausoleum constructed in the 1890s, but this was destroyed by a Second World War bomb in 1941.

See also
 List of people buried at Willesden Jewish Cemetery
 United Synagogue
 Liberal Jewish Cemetery, Willesden
 Willesden New Cemetery
 Jewish cemeteries in the London area

Notes

References

External links
 Official website
Willesden Jewish Cemetery: "Life Lines"
United Synagogue: Our Cemeteries
Jewish Museum London video about the cemetery

Willesden Jewish Cemetery
Jewish Cemetery, Willesden
Jewish Cemetery, Willesden
Jewish Cemetery, Willesden
Jewish Cemetery, Willesden
Commonwealth War Graves Commission memorials
Franklin family (Anglo-Jewish)
Gothic Revival architecture in London
Grade II listed monuments and memorials
Grade II listed parks and gardens in London
Grade II listed religious buildings and structures
Willesden
Nathan Solomon Joseph buildings
Orthodox Judaism in London
Jewish Cemetery, Willesden
Jewish Cemetery, Willesden
Rothschild family
Jewish Cemetery
Jewish Cemetery, Willesden
Jewish Cemetery, Willesden